Peter Adds is Wellington-based academic, treaty negotiator and former head of Victoria University of Wellington's Te Kawa a Māui/School of Māori Studies. He is of Te Ati Awa descent. With a background in anthropology and archaeology, he has interests in Treaty of Waitangi settlements, indigenous astronomy, Māori development, and international indigenous issues.

Adds is  the founding head of the  Māori Association of Social Science,  and has campaigned for a less government-sided view of New Zealand history to be taught in schools.

A 2014 thesis by Dougal Austin supervised by Adds and based on a survey of the collection of hei-tiki at Te Papa Tongarewa and early-contact examples in foreign collections, found that the mana of hei tiki is derived from the "agency of prolonged ancestral use" and stylistically was  "highly developed [...] from the outset to conform to adze-shaped pieces of pounamu."

Selected works
Contested Ground: Te Whenua I Tohea, the Taranaki Wars 1860–1881, chapter Te Muru me te Raupatu: The Aftermath  (won the Nga Kupu Ora Maori Book Awards)
A Brilliant Civilisation in The transit of Venus: how a rare astronomical alignment changed the world. Wellington, Awa Press, 2007, . (shortlisted for the  Montana Book Awards 2008) 
 First Footprints: People, Land and Resources in Aotearoa. Auckland. Pearsons, 2006.

References

External links
Staff page at Victoria University of Wellington

Te Āti Awa people
Living people
Academic staff of the Victoria University of Wellington
Year of birth missing (living people)